Sanjay Kumar Sharma is an Indian politician who is serving as Member of 18th Uttar Pradesh Legislative Assembly from Anupshahr Assembly constituency. In 2022 Uttar Pradesh Legislative Assembly election, he won with 1,25,602 votes.

References 

Living people
Uttar Pradesh MLAs 2022–2027
Year of birth missing (living people)